James P. Mays served as Commissioner of Elections in Orangeburg County, South Carolina and served in the South Carolina House of Representatives during the Reconstruction era in 1868. He also served as coroner, first appointed in 1873.

History
In 1872, he alleged election tampering in a statement he made as a Commissioner of Elections for Orangeburg.

After 1885, he and his wife Isabella moved to Chattanooga, Tennessee.

References

Year of birth missing
19th-century American politicians
African-American politicians during the Reconstruction Era
Year of death missing
American coroners
Politicians from Chattanooga, Tennessee
People from Orangeburg County, South Carolina
African-American state legislators in South Carolina